Suspense Themes in Jazz is an album by jazz trombonist and arranger Kai Winding featuring jazz arrangements of theme music from motion pictures recorded in 1962 for the Verve label.

Track listing
 "Night Side" (Henry Mancini) - 2:29
 "Experiment in Terror" (Mancini) - 2:20
 "Walk on the Wild Side" (Elmer Bernstein, Mack David) - 2:20
 "The 3rd Man Theme" (Anton Karas, Walter Lord) - 2:15
 "Stella by Starlight" (Victor Young, Ned Washington) - 2:14
 "Molly Malone" (Traditional) - 2:55
 "Hatari" (Mancini) - 2:28
 "Just for Tonight" (Hoagy Carmichael, Johnny Mercer) - 2:14
 "Baby Elephant Walk" (Mancini) - 2:35
 "Blues Theme from "Reprieve" (Ya Hear Me)" (Leonard Rosenman, Lenny Adelson) - 2:35
 "Advise & Consent" (Jerry Fielding) - 2:35
 "Laura" (David Raksin, Mercer) - 2:48

Personnel 
Kai Winding - trombone, arranger
Unidentified band and orchestra
Oliver Nelson - arranger (tracks 2, 3, 6, 7, 9 & 10)

References 

1962 albums
Verve Records albums
Kai Winding albums
Albums produced by Creed Taylor
Albums arranged by Oliver Nelson
Albums recorded at Van Gelder Studio